Events from the year 1953 in Taiwan, Republic of China. This year is numbered Minguo 42 according to the official Republic of China calendar.

Incumbents
 President – Chiang Kai-shek
 Vice President – Li Zongren
 Premier – Chen Cheng
 Vice Premier – Chang Li-sheng

Events

January
 24 January – The opening of Xiluo Bridge connecting Changhua County and Yunlin County.

September
 10 September – Yulon Motor Co., Ltd. was established in Taiwan.

November
 27 November – Syngman Rhee, President of South Korea, visited Taiwan and met with Chiang Kai-shek, the leader of the Republic of China.

Births
 1 January – Lu Chia-chen, member of Legislative Yuan (2008–2016)
 5 February – Wei Kuo-yen, Minister of Environmental Protection Administration (2014–2016)
 12 February – Katharine Chang, Chairperson of Straits Exchange Foundation (2018–2020)
 22 February – Tan Ai-chen, actress
 12 March – Chiang Mu-tsai, manager of Chinese Taipei national football team (1994–2000)
 16 March – Lee Ying-yuan, Minister of Environmental Protection Administration (2016–2018)
 5 April – Shu Chin-chiang, Chairperson of Taiwan Solidarity Union (2005–2006)
 12 April
 Chiu Kuo-cheng, Director-General of National Security Bureau
 Wu Hsing-kuo, actor
 6 May – Lee Chu-feng, Magistrate of Kinmen County (2001–2009)
 24 May – Chen Wei-zen, Minister of the Interior (2014–2016)
 13 June – Hsu Ming-tsai, Mayor of Hsinchu City (2009–2014)
 29 June – Teresa Teng, singer
 10 July – Su Chih-fen, Magistrate of Yunlin County (2005–2014)
 17 July – Chiau Wen-yan, member of 8th Legislative Yuan
 21 July – Sylvia Chang, actress, writer, singer, producer and director
 20 August – Fong Fei-fei, former singer and actress
 22 August – Huang Chao-shun, member of Legislative Yuan
 20 September – Lai Feng-wei, Magistrate of Penghu County
 24 October – Shih Szu, actress
 25 October – Ding Kung-wha, Chairperson of Financial Supervisory Commission (2016)
 10 November – Chen Bao-ji, Minister of Council of Agriculture (2012–2016)

Deaths
 19 November – Wu Tieh-cheng, Vice Premier of the Republic of China (1948–1949).

References

 
Years of the 20th century in Taiwan